Charles Sabouret (8 June 1884 – 18 April 1967) was a French figure skater. He participated in the Olympic Games in Antwerp 1920 (seventh place) and Chamonix 1924 (ninth place) in Pair Skating along with Simone Sabouret.

References

External links
 

1884 births
1967 deaths
French male pair skaters
Figure skaters at the 1920 Summer Olympics
Figure skaters at the 1924 Winter Olympics
Olympic figure skaters of France